Damián Álvaro de Santo (born June 12, 1968) is an Argentine actor.

Biography 
He began his studies of dramatic art with Lito Cruz and studied in the Casa del Teatro.

Personal life 
He was the boyfriend of the Argentine singer Laura Miller. He has been married since 2001 with Vanina Bilous, a tango dancer, with whom he has two children Joaquín and Camilo. Since 2005, he lives for a large part of the year in the Cordoba town of Villa Giardino. where he owns a cabin complex.

Career 
His first job as an actor was in the play La tiendita del horror. At that time he met Fernán Mirás, who introduced him to the world of television after proposing a rapist role in the series Zona de riesgo. At that time he also worked on the television series Princesa next to Gabriel Corrado. Damián de Santo would already be a known face for supporting roles in series like Canto rodado, Aprender a volar, Sheik, Amigovios and Mi cuñado. However, the opportunity came to work on the successful series Poliladron of Adrián Suar. From this intervention he began to gain notoriety, especially in the role of Ariel Quintana, the gay lawyer of Verdad consecuencia and Gonzalo Pierna Molina, a rich boy who hides in cocaine to avoid his family in Vulnerables. After a television impás, he returns with the sitcom Amor Mío next to  Romina Yankelevich and in 2008 he returns to work with Romina Yankelevich in the television series B&B: Bella y Bestia. In cinema his appearances are still reduced to secondary roles in important productions such as El sueño de los héroes, Alma mía and  Un día de suerte.

Filmography

Television

Movies

Television Programs

Awards and nominations

References

External links
 

20th-century Argentine male actors
Living people
People from Buenos Aires
1968 births
21st-century Argentine male actors
Argentine male film actors
Argentine male television actors
Place of birth missing (living people)